Primera División A (Méxican First A Division) is a Mexican football tournament. This season was composed of Invieno 1998 and Verano 1999. Unión de Curtidores, Verano 1999 champion, were able to gain promotion to Primera Division for the 1999-2000 season after winning the playoff to Yucatán, Invierno 1998 champion. However, the Puebla F.C. acquired the franchise belonging to Union de Curtidores to remain in the First Division.

Changes for the 1998–99 season
Tampico Madero was disaffiliated by the FMF.
Gallos de Aguascalientes was promoted by winning the 1997–98 Second Division season.
Veracruz was relegated from Primera División.
Tecos Colima renamed Jaguares de Colima.

Stadiums and locations

Invierno 1998

Group league tables

Group 1

Group 2

Group 3

Group 4

General league table

Results

Reclassification series

Liguilla

Top scorers

Verano 1999

Group league tables

Group 1

Group 2

Group 3

Group 4

General league table

Results

Reclassification series

Liguilla

Top scorers

Relegation table

Promotion final
At the end of the season, the two champions played a final to determine the winner of the promotion to Primera División. The series faced Yucatán, champion of the Invierno 1998 tournament against Unión de Curtidores, champion of the Verano 1999 tournament.

First leg

Second leg

References

1998–99 in Mexican football
Ascenso MX seasons